Denver City Independent School District is a public school district based in Denver City, Texas (USA).

In 2009, the school district was rated "recognized" by the Texas Education Agency.

Schools 
Denver City High School
2007 National Blue Ribbon School
W. G. Gravitt Junior High School
Kelley/Dodson Elementary School
2004 National Blue Ribbon School

References

External links 
 Denver City ISD

School districts in Yoakum County, Texas